Brett Mahony (born 4 April 1970) is a former Australian rules footballer who played two games for Richmond in the Victorian Football League (VFL) in 1989. He was recruited from the De La Salle in the Victorian Amateur Football Association  (VAFA).

References

External links

Living people
1970 births
Richmond Football Club players
De La Salle OC Amateur Football Club players
Australian rules footballers from Victoria (Australia)